The Pioneer Collegiate Baseball League was a collegiate summer baseball league based in Iowa, comprising teams of the top college players from North America and beyond. Players in the league must have college eligibility remaining, or be graduating seniors in order to participate. Players are not paid, so as to maintain their college eligibility.

History 
PCBL formed in the summer of 2017 with five member teams competing. Teams play a 32-game regular season beginning in June followed by a league playoff.

Carroll Merchants finished season one with the best regular season record and swept their way to the championship game eliminating Bancroft Bandits in two games. Second place Storm Lake Whitecaps needed three games in their semifinal series against Sioux Falls Gold to advance then won the first league championship by defeating Carroll 8-5.

Albert Lea pitcher Ben Madison of Central Baptist College (NAIA) became the first PCBL player drafted by a Major League Baseball team when the San Francisco Giants selected him in the 2018 MLB Draft.

Expansion came in January 2019 when it was announced a team would be placed in Fort Dodge. The team was later named the Gypsum Miners. The Albert Lea Lakers were disbanded by the league owner two days before the 2019 playoffs and were denied the chance to compete in the playoffs. The Bancroft Bandits would go on to win the 2019 league championship over the Carroll Merchants 7-5 in one 9 inning game. Michael Keeran was the head coach of both the 2018 Lakers and 2019 Bandits championship teams.

Teams

Former teams 

 Albert Lea Lakers (2017-2019)
Peak Prospects (2018-2019)
Sioux Falls Gold (2017)

Champions

References

External links 

Summer baseball leagues
College baseball leagues in the United States
Baseball leagues in Iowa
Baseball leagues in Minnesota
Sports leagues established in 2017